Drug Safety Research Unit (DSRU) is an independent, non-profit organisation in the United Kingdom, in the field of pharmacology. It is an associate college of the University of Portsmouth, offering postgraduate qualifications in pharmacovigilance.

The unit is based in Southampton, and was established in 1981 by Bill Inman and David Finney. Its director as of July 2021 is Professor Saad Shakir.

It is operated by the Drug Safety Research Trust, a charitable organization registered in England and Wales.

References

External links 

 

1981 establishments in the United Kingdom
Organisations based in Southampton
Drug safety
University of Portsmouth